Sulamith Ish-kishor (1896 – June 23, 1977) was an American writer, known for her religious and children's literature.

Biography
Her father was a well-known writer of Jewish children's literature and an early proponent of Hovevei Zion, a pre-Zionist movement, and later of political Zionism. Her older sister, Judith Ish-Kishor, was a pioneering writer of Jewish children's literature in English.

Sulamith began writing at age 5 and had several of her poems printed in British publications by the time she was 10. When Sulamith was 13, her family moved to New York City (like the family in her novel Our Eddie).

At Hunter College, she studied languages and history.
She wrote widely, and was published in several magazines, including The New Yorker, Saturday Review, and Reader's Digest. Her now-classic story of a long-distance correspondence and its fateful conclusion, "Appointment with Love," was published in a 1943 edition of Collier's and was subsequently plagiarized by preacher-author Max Lucado (as "The Rose") in a 1992 collection.

Our Eddie was a 1970 Newbery Honor book. It portrays a father whose abusive treatment of his child contrasts with the Jewish values he claims to promote. A Boy of Old Prague, which recounts the friendship between a 16th-century Gentile boy and a Jewish family was a popular selection of the Scholastic Book Club in the 1970s and dealt with the issue of anti-semitism in late Renaissance Europe.

Works 
  (reprinted, Nabu Press )
 The Heaven on the Sea, together with Twenty Poems, New York, Bloch Publishing Co, 1924
 Friday night stories: Series I, New York: The Women's League of the United Synagogue of America (reprinted 1949)
 Friday Night Stories. Series II, New York: The Women's League of the United Synagogue of America, 1928
 The Children's Story of the Bible, a Bible History for School And Home, New York, Educational Stationery House, 1930
 Childrens History of Israel  (In 3 Volumes Illustrated: Volume One: From Creation to the Passing of Moses. Volume Two: From Joshua to the Second Temple. Volume Three: From the Second Temple to the Present Time), Jordan Publishing Company, 1933
 Magnificent Hadrian: A Biography of Hadrian, Emperor of Rome, New York, Minton, Balch & Company, 1935 (also London, Victor Gollancz, 1935)
 Jews to Remember, Hebrew Publishing Company, 1941
 "Appointment With Love," Collier's, June 5, 1943 (fulltext available)
 American Promise: A History of the Jews in the New World, New York, Behrman House, 1947
 Everyman's history of the Jews, New York, Frederick Fell, 1948
 The Palace of Eagles and Other Stories, New York, The Shoulson Press, 1948
 A Stranger Within Thy Gates, New York, The Shoulson Press, 1948
 Blessed Is the Daughter  Shengold Publishers, Inc., 1959 reprinted 
 How Theodor Herzl Created the Jewish National Fund Together with an album of Herzliana, a chronology and excerpts from his diaries and autobiography"", New York, Youth and Education Department, Jewish National Fund, 1960 (reprinted )
 A Boy of Old Prague, Pantheon Books, 1963
 The Carpet of Solomon: A Hebrew Legend, Pantheon Books, 1966 
 Zalman Shazar: President of the People, New York, Youth and Education Department, Jewish National Fund, 1966
 Pathways Through the Jewish Holidays, Hoboken, New Jersey, KTAV Publishing House, 1967 
 Our Eddie, Pantheon Books, 1969 
 Drusilla, a Novel of the Emperor Hadrian, Pantheon Books, 1970  )
 The Master of Miracle: A New Novel of the Golem, Harper & Row, 1971 
 Ferrer, the Sweetest Sula, 2006
 Meggie and the Fairies, New York: Works Progress Administration

 Awards 

 1964: National Jewish Book Award for A Boy of Old Prague''

References

External links
  (including 7 "from old catalog")

1896 births
1977 deaths
Hunter College alumni
20th-century American novelists
Newbery Honor winners
American women short story writers
American children's writers
American Jews
American historical novelists
American women poets
Place of death missing
American women children's writers
British emigrants to the United States
Writers from London
American women novelists
20th-century American women writers
20th-century American poets
Women historical novelists
20th-century American short story writers
English people of Jewish descent